Sidney Ernest Cramp is an Australian politician. He was the Liberal National Party member for Gaven in the Queensland Legislative Assembly from 2015 to 2017.

References

Year of birth missing (living people)
Living people
Members of the Queensland Legislative Assembly
Liberal National Party of Queensland politicians
21st-century Australian politicians